Lost Souls is the debut album by the folk/roots rock band the Raindogs, released in 1990 on Atco Records. Written by lead singer Mark Cutler and presenting a hybrid roots rock sound with Celtic elements, Lost Souls drew critical attention but was not a commercial success.

Critical reception
AllMusic wrote that "Lost Souls is perfectly played material and an interesting debut, but there's not enough personality to send this over the top." The Los Angeles Times thought that the "lilting yet propulsive fiddle gusts, swirling through the basic guitar-rock architecture, give Raindogs both sweetness and bite." The Orlando Sentinel deemed the album "a solid effort [on which] none of the songs really stood out." The Washington Post called it "catchy but a little cautious." The Rolling Stone Album Guide declared the album to be "a perfectly unremarkable example of foursquare folk-rock traditionalism."

Track listing 
(All tracks written by Mark Cutler)
 "I'm Not Scared"  3:23
 "May Your Heart Keep Beating"  3:50
 "Phantom Flame"  3:31
 "The Higher Road"  3:04
 "Too Many Stars"  3:19
 "Nobody's Getting Out"  3:18
 "Cry for Mercy"  3:37
 "Adventure"  3:04
 "This Is the Place"  3:57
 "Under the Rainbow"  3:59
 "I Believe"  4:17
 "Something Wouldn't Be the Same"  4:43

Personnel 
Mark Cutler - lead vocals/guitar
Johnny Cunningham - fiddle/mandolin
Jim Reilly - drums
Darren Hill - bass
Emerson Torrey - guitar/vocals
Jim Fitting - harmonica
Gordon Beadle/Scott Shetler/Curtis Stone/Myanna Pontoppidan - horns
Richard Reed/Peter Henderson - keyboards
Cheryl Hodge - background vocals
Tony Cuffe - whistles
Sa Davies - percussion
Ralph Tufo - accordion

References

The Raindogs albums
1990 debut albums
Atco Records albums